Iain Robert Rennie  (born 1964) was appointed as the State Services Commissioner of the New Zealand public service in 2008 succeeding Mark Prebble. He was the Deputy State Services Commissioner from 2007 until June 2008.  He was reappointed for a second term in July 2013.

History 

Rennie has a BA (Hons) in Economics from Victoria University of Wellington. He joined the Treasury in 1986, and also worked for 1990-93 and 2004 in the Department of the Prime Minister and Cabinet. Before he was appointed to the SSC, he helped provide strategic leadership at the Treasury - advising the Minister of Finance on microeconomic and macroeconomic policy issues.

State Services Commissioner 

In his role as Commissioner, Rennie has been involved in a number of initiatives to improve the performance of the public service including projects called Better Public Services, the Performance Improvement Framework. The State Sector Amendment Act 2013 gave him greater responsibility for developing senior leadership and management capability, including appointments to key positions within the public service. He is also responsible for driving state sector reform in line with the Government's objectives.

References

External links
Rennie steps up to replace boss as State Services head

1964 births
Living people
New Zealand public servants
Victoria University of Wellington alumni
Companions of the New Zealand Order of Merit